John Balfour "Iain" McCulloch (born 28 December 1954) is a Scottish former footballer.

Playing as a winger or forward, McCulloch began his career with his hometown club Kilmarnock before joining Notts County in 1978. He won promotion with the Magpies in 1980–81, and was their top scorer in the First Division for two consecutive seasons. After County's relegation in 1984, he joined Kettering Town.

McCulloch played twice for the Scotland national under-21 football team, as an over-age player, in 1982.

He had a spell as a coach at Carlton Town

References

External links

1954 births
Living people
Footballers from Kilmarnock
Scottish footballers
Kilmarnock F.C. players
Notts County F.C. players
Kettering Town F.C. players
Scottish Football League players
English Football League players
Scotland under-21 international footballers
Association football wingers